Douglas Robert Barrie (born October 2, 1946) is a Canadian former ice hockey defenceman. He played in the National Hockey League for the Pittsburgh Penguins, Buffalo Sabres, and Los Angeles Kings between 1969 and 1972. He also played in the World Hockey Association for the Alberta/Edmonton Oilers between 1972 and 1977.

He was traded from the Detroit Red Wings to the Toronto Maple Leafs for the contractual rights to Carl Brewer on March 4, 1968. He finished the remainder of the 1967–68 season with the Tulsa Oilers.

In his NHL career, Barrie played in 158 games, scoring 10 goals and adding 42 assists.  He played in 350 WHA games, scoring 37 goals and adding 122 assists.

Career statistics

Regular season and playoffs

References

External links
 

1946 births
Living people
Amarillo Wranglers players
Baltimore Clippers players
Buffalo Sabres players
Canadian expatriate ice hockey players in the United States
Canadian ice hockey defencemen
Edmonton Oil Kings (WCHL) players
Edmonton Oilers (WHA) players
Los Angeles Kings players
Omaha Knights (CHL) players
Pittsburgh Hornets players
Pittsburgh Penguins players
Ice hockey people from Edmonton
Tulsa Oilers (1964–1984) players